Merlin Santana (March 14, 1976 – November 9, 2002) was an American actor and rapper. Beginning his career in the early 1990s, Santana was best known for his roles as Rudy Huxtable's boyfriend Stanley on The Cosby Show, Marcus Dixon on Getting By, Marcus Henry in Under One Roof and Romeo Santana on The WB sitcom The Steve Harvey Show (19962002).

Early life
Born in Upper Manhattan, New York City to parents from the Dominican Republic, Santana's career in show business began with a push from his parents, who wanted to keep him off the tough streets of New York. He began his career at the age of three as an advertising model for a fast food chain. His first screen appearance was as an extra in the Woody Allen film, The Purple Rose of Cairo.

Acting career
In 1991, Santana landed a recurring role on The Cosby Show as Stanley, the boyfriend of Rudy Huxtable and the rival of Rudy's friend Kenny (Deon Richmond). He was then cast as Marcus Dixon in the short-lived sitcom, Getting By, starring Cindy Williams and Telma Hopkins. Deon Richmond was cast as his brother Darren, due to their interaction on The Cosby Show.

In November 1994, Santana appeared on Sister, Sister as Joey, who falls in love with Tia and Tamera (Tia and Tamera Mowry) at Rocket Burger.

In 1995, Santana was cast as Marcus Henry in the short-lived CBS family drama Under One Roof, co-starring with James Earl Jones, Joe Morton and Vanessa Bell Calloway. Between 1996 and 1999, he played the role of Ohagi on Moesha.

In 1996, he landed the role of Romeo Santana on The Steve Harvey Show. In 2001, he played the role of Jermaine in the movie Flossin. In 2002, he appeared in the VH1 TV movie, Play'd: A Hip Hop Story with Toni Braxton. That same year, Santana had a role in the Eddie Murphy comedy Showtime. His last television acting role was on the UPN series, Half & Half, while his last film role was in the 2003 comedy film, The Blues with Deon Richmond.

Death

Shooting
On November 9, 2002, Santana was murdered while sitting in a car in Los Angeles. Santana and his friend, actor Brandon Adams, just left an acquaintance's home in the Crenshaw District when the suspect Damien Andre Gates fired the shot that entered through the trunk of the vehicle in which Santana was a passenger. The bullet penetrated the right-front passenger headrest and entered Santana's head, killing him.

On November 18, 2002, Santana, age 26, was buried at Saint Raymond's Cemetery in The Bronx borough of New York City.

Trial and Allegations against Gates
In 2003, Gates was convicted of the first-degree murder of Santana and the attempted murder of Adams and was sentenced to three consecutive life sentences plus 70 years in prison.

Brandon Douglas Bynes, the other suspect who was with Gates during the shooting, received a 23-year sentence after pleading guilty to voluntary manslaughter and assault with a deadly weapon.

An LAPD officer involved in the case testified that Monique King, reportedly shooter Gates's girlfriend, only aged 15 at the time, falsely claimed that Santana made sexual advances towards her which prompted the Gates' and Bynes' attack.

In January 2004, King was found guilty of second-degree murder and attempted murder, but was acquitted on two murder charges, receiving ten years in juvenile custody as a result of Santana's death.

Filmography

References

External links

 
 

1976 births
2002 deaths
2002 murders in the United States
20th-century American male actors
21st-century American male actors
Male actors from New York City
American male child actors
American child models
American male television actors
American male film actors
American murder victims
American people of Dominican Republic descent
Deaths by firearm in California
Hispanic and Latino American male actors
People from Manhattan
People murdered in Los Angeles
Deaths from bleeding
Burials at Saint Raymond's Cemetery (Bronx)
Rappers from New York City